The Ministry of Sports, Culture and Heritage was established through the Executive Order No. 2 “Organization of the Government of the Republic of Kenya dated May 2013”.It comprises departments of Sports, Office of the Sports Registrar, Culture, Permanent Presidential Music Commission, Kenya National Archives and Documentation Services, Library Services, Records Management, The Arts Services.

There are also Semi-Autonomous Government Agencies (SAGAs) namely Sports Kenya, Kenya Academy of Sports, National Sports Fund, National Museums of Kenya, Kenya Cultural Centre, and the Kenya National Library Service. Others include National Heroes Council, Anti-Doping Agency Kenya. Its current Cabinet Secretary is Amina Mohamed.

Past Ministers 

 Najib Balala (2002–2003)
 Ochilo Ayacko (2003–2005)
 Maina Kamanda (2005–2007)
 Esther Murugi (2008–2009)
 Naomi Shaaban (2009–2013)
 Hassan Wario (2013-2018)
 Rashid Echesa (2018-2019)
 Amina Mohammed (2019- )

The ministry also controls an association football team known as Ministry of Sports, Culture and the Arts Football Club (MOSCA) that currently competes in the Kenyan National Super League, the second tier of the Kenyan football league system. The team, formerly known as MOYAS (Ministry of Youth and Sports), was reportedly set to break off from the ministry and become an independent football club.

See also
Kenya
Heads of State of Kenya
Heads of Government of Kenya
Vice-Presidents of Kenya
Colonial Heads of Kenya

References

Kenya
Ministries established in 1963
Kenyan National Super League clubs
FKF Division One clubs
Football clubs in Kenya